Kainonychus is a genus of harvestman in the family Paranonychidae. There is one described species in Kainonychus, K. akamai, endemic to Japan.

References

Further reading

 
 
 

Harvestmen